4 Union Street is a Category C listed building in Peterhead, Aberdeenshire, Scotland. Dating to the late 18th century, the residential building stands at the corner of Union and Broad Streets, to the west of the Fishermen's Mission and directly opposite Peterhead's dry dock. It sits in front of Arbuthnot House, the town's former municipal chambers.

See also
List of listed buildings in Peterhead, Aberdeenshire

References

External links
 A 2018 listing of 4 Union Street - MasonGlennie.co.uk

Category C listed buildings in Aberdeenshire
Union Street 4